The Voice of the Eagle is the eighth studio album by composer and guitarist Robbie Basho, released in 1972 by Vanguard Records.

Track listing

Personnel
Adapted from The Voice of the Eagle liner notes.

Musicians
 Robbie Basho – acoustic guitar, vocals
 Ramnad Raghavan – mridangam

Production and additional personnel
 Jack Lothrop – production
 Frank Porpot – cover art
 Jeff Zaraya – engineering

Release history

References

External links 
 

1972 albums
Robbie Basho albums
Vanguard Records albums